Chahoonga Main Tujhe is a 1993 Indian Hindi-language film produced by Asgar Hussain and directed by Kamal, starring Irfan Kamal and Niloo Kapoor with Kiran Kumar and Kader Khan.

Cast

Irfan Kamal
Niloo Kapoor
Kiran Kumar
Kader Khan

Soundtrack
"Chahunga Main Tujhe Lekin" - Mohammed Aziz
"I Love You I Hate You" - Vinod Rathod, Alka Yagnik
"Jao Logo Jao" - Alka Yagnik
"Kar Mujhe Salaam" - Mohd Aziz
"Tera Badan Bhi Ek Shola" - Alka Yagnik & Amit Kumar
"Wah Wah Kare Yeh Sari Duniya" - Sudesh Bhosle & Vinod Rathod

References

External links
 

1993 films
1990s Hindi-language films
Indian action films
Films scored by Laxmikant–Pyarelal
1993 action films
Hindi-language action films